"Please Send Me Someone to Love" is a blues ballad, written and recorded by American blues and soul singer Percy Mayfield in 1950, for  Art Rupe's Specialty Records. It was on the Billboard's R&B chart for 27 weeks and reached the number-one position for two weeks; it was Mayfield's most successful song.

Song background
It has been called a "multilayered universal lament".
Mayfield sang it in a soft ballad style. Its appeal lay in the sensitivity of its lyrics in juxtaposing an awareness of a world in conflict with a personal expression of the need for love.
Sung in Mayfield's gentle, suave vocal style, the lyrics were a combination of a romantic love ballad and a social message against discrimination.

Track listing
US 7"Vinyl
 "Please Send Me Someone to Love" (2:50)	
 "Strange Things Happening" (2:49)

Charts

Johnny Diesel and the Injectors version
{{Infobox song
| name       = Please Send Me Someone to Love
| cover      = Please_Send_Me_Someone_to_Love_by_Johnny_Diesel_and_the_Injectors.jpg
| alt        =
| type       = single
| artist     = Johnny Diesel and the Injectors
| album      = The Delinquents (soundtrack)
| B-side     = "Who's for Better" (Live)
| released   = January 1990
| recorded   =
| studio     =
| venue      =
| genre      =
| length     = 4:17
| label      = Chrysalis
| writer     = Percy Mayfield
| producer   = Terry Manning
| prev_title = Since I Fell for You
| prev_year  = 1989
| next_title = Love Junk
| next_year  = 1991
}}
In 1989, the Australian ARIA award-winning rock band Johnny Diesel and the Injectors recorded the song for the soundtrack of the film The Delinquents. It was released as a single and peaked at number 11 on the Australian ARIA chart and was the 87th biggest-selling single in 1990.

Track listing
 "Please Send Me Someone to Love" (4:17)	
 "Who's for Better" (3:40)
 "Thang 1" (3:15)
 Tracks 2 and 3 recorded live at the Hordern Pavilion, Sydney, Australia, August 16, 1989

Other versions
 Dinah Washington released a cover of the song in 1951.
 The Moonglows had a hit with their cover version in 1957.
 In 1967, Fred Neil covered the song for his album Sessions.
 In 1968, Toni Williams covered the song. It was the B-side of his single "Sad, Lonely and Blue", released by Zodiac Records.
 In 1969, Ruth Brown covered the song for her album Black Is Brown and Brown Is Beautiful.
 Freddie King recorded his version during his years with Shelter Records.
 Paul Butterfield covered the song on his 1973 album Paul Butterfield's Better Days In 1977, The Animals covered the song on their reunion album, Before We Were So Rudely Interrupted.
 James Booker covered the song on his album King Of New Orleans Keyboard. In 2003, Leigh Harris and Larry Sieberth covered it on the album Patchwork: A Tribute to James Booker.
 In 1997, B.B. King and Mick Hucknall covered the song on the album  Deuces Wild. 
 In 1993, Sade released a cover of the song for the soundtrack of the movie Philadelphia.
 In 1994, Grover Washington Jr. recorded the song for his album All My Tomorrows.
 In 1998, Fiona Apple released a cover of the song for the soundtrack of the movie Pleasantville.
 In 2011, John Oates released a cover of the song for his solo album Mississippi Mile''.

References

1950 singles
1990 singles
Diesel (musician) songs
Grammy Hall of Fame Award recipients
Songs written by Percy Mayfield
1950 songs
Chrysalis Records singles
1950s ballads